Trimethylamine (TMA) is an organic compound with the formula N(CH3)3. It is a colorless, hygroscopic, and flammable tertiary amine. It is a gas at room temperature but is usually sold as a 40% solution in water. (It is also sold in pressurized gas cylinders.) TMA is a nitrogenous base and can be readily protonated to give the trimethylammonium cation. Trimethylammonium chloride is a hygroscopic colorless solid prepared from hydrochloric acid.  Trimethylamine is a good nucleophile, and this reaction is the basis of most of its applications. 
TMA is widely used in industry: it is used in the synthesis of choline, tetramethylammonium hydroxide, plant growth regulators or herbicides, strongly basic anion exchange resins, dye leveling agents, and a number of basic dyes. At higher concentrations it has an ammonia-like odor, and can cause necrosis of mucous membranes on contact. At lower concentrations, it has a "fishy" odor, the odor associated with rotting fish.

In humans, ingestion of certain plant and animal (e.g., red meat, egg yolk) food containing lecithin, choline and L-carnitine provides certain gut microbiota with the substrate to synthesize TMA, which is then absorbed into the bloodstream. High levels of trimethylamine in the body are associated with the development of trimethylaminuria, or fish odor syndrome, caused by a genetic defect in the enzyme which degrades TMA; or by taking large doses of supplements containing choline or L-carnitine. TMA is metabolized by the liver to trimethylamine N-oxide (TMAO); TMAO is being investigated as a possible proatherogenic substance which may accelerate atherosclerosis in those eating foods with a high content of TMA precursors. TMA also causes the odor of some human infections, bad breath, and bacterial vaginosis.

Trimethylamine is a full agonist of human TAAR5, a trace amine-associated receptor that is expressed in the olfactory epithelium and functions as an olfactory receptor for tertiary amines. One or more additional odorant receptors appear to be involved in trimethylamine olfaction in humans as well.

Production
Trimethylamine is prepared by the reaction of ammonia and methanol employing a catalyst:
3 CH3OH + NH3 → (CH3)3N  +  3 H2O
This reaction coproduces the other methylamines, dimethylamine (CH3)2NH and methylamine CH3NH2.

Trimethylamine has also been prepared by a reaction of ammonium chloride and paraformaldehyde:
 9 (CH2=O)n + 2n NH4Cl → 2n (CH3)3N•HCl + 3n H2O + 3n CO2↑

Toxicity 
Acute and chronic toxic effects of TMA were suggested in medical literature as early as the 19th century. TMA causes eye and skin irritation, and it is suggested to be a uremic toxin. In patients, trimethylamine caused stomach ache, vomiting, diarrhoea, lacrimation, greying of the skin and agitation. Apart from that, reproductive/developmental toxicity has been reported.

Guidelines with exposure limit for workers are available e.g. the Recommendation from the Scientific Committee on Occupational Exposure Limits by the European Union Commission.

Some experimental studies suggested that TMA may be involved in etiology of cardiovascular diseases.

Applications
Trimethylamine is used in the synthesis of choline, tetramethylammonium hydroxide, plant growth regulators, herbicides, strongly basic anion exchange resins, dye leveling agents and a number of basic dyes. Gas sensors to test for fish freshness detect trimethylamine.

Reactions
Trimethylamine is a Lewis base that forms adducts with a variety of Lewis acids.

Trimethylaminuria

Trimethylaminuria is an autosomal recessive genetic disorder involving a defect in the function or expression of flavin-containing monooxygenase 3 (FMO3) which results in poor trimethylamine metabolism. Individuals with trimethylaminuria develop a characteristic fish odor—the smell of trimethylamine—in their sweat, urine, and breath after the consumption of choline-rich foods. A condition similar to trimethylaminuria has also been observed in a certain breed of Rhode Island Red chicken that produces eggs with a fishy smell, especially after eating food containing a high proportion of rapeseed.

See also
 Ammonia, NH3
 Ammonium, NH4+
 Methylamine, (CH3)NH2
 Triethylamine (TEA)

References

External links
 Molecule of the Month: Trimethylamine
 NIST Webbook data
 CDC - NIOSH Pocket Guide to Chemical Hazards

Pesticides
Dimethylamino compounds
Foul-smelling chemicals